Road Food is the twelfth studio album by the Canadian rock band The Guess Who. It was originally released by RCA Records in 1974. It was the last album by the group to feature guitarists Kurt Winter and Donnie McDougall.

Release history

In addition to the usual 2-channel stereo version the album was also released by RCA in a 4-channel quadraphonic version on both LP and 8-track tape. The quad LP version was released using the Quadradisc system.

On the first CD issue, the songs from side two of the original album were switched with the songs from side one. This means that it begins with "Clap for the Wolfman", rather than "Star Baby".

The album was reissued on CD in 2012 by Iconoclassic with 2 bonus tracks.

In 2018 the album was reissued again in the UK by Dutton Vocalion on the Super Audio CD format. This disc is a 2 albums on 1 disc compilation which also contains the 1973 album #10. The Dutton Vocalion release contains the complete stereo and quad versions of both albums.

Track listing
All songs written by Burton Cummings except noted.
Side one
 "Star Baby" (Cummings) – 2:38
 "Attila's Blues" (The Guess Who) – 4:54
 "Straighten Out" (Cummings, Wallace) – 2:22
 "Don't You Want Me" (Cummings) – 2:20
 "One Way Road to Hell" (Cummings, Wallace) – 5:26
Side two
"Clap for the Wolfman" (Cummings, Wallace, Winter) – 4:15
 "Pleasin' for Reason" (McDougall, Cummings) – 3:17
 "Road Food" (Wallace, Cummings) – 3:39 
 "Ballad of the Last Five Years" (Cummings) – 7:15

2012 Iconoclassic Remaster Bonus Tracks
"Sona Sona" (sans 1988 overdubs) (Cummings)
"One Way Road to Hell" (run through)

Personnel
The Guess Who
Burton Cummings – lead vocals, keyboards
Kurt Winter – lead guitar
Donnie McDougall – rhythm guitar, backing vocals 
Bill Wallace – bass, backing vocals
Garry Peterson – drums

Additional personnel
Wolfman Jack - voice on "Clap for the Wolfman"
Jack Richardson - producer
Brian Christian - engineer

Charts
Album

Singles

References

1974 albums
The Guess Who albums
Albums produced by Jack Richardson (record producer)
RCA Records albums